The zero-width non-joiner (ZWNJ)  is a non-printing character used in the computerization of writing systems that make use of ligatures. When placed between two characters that would otherwise be connected into a ligature, a ZWNJ causes them to be printed in their final and initial forms, respectively. This is also an effect of a space character, but a ZWNJ is used when it is desirable to keep the characters closer together or to connect a word with its morpheme.

Use of ZWNJ and unit separator for correct typography 
In certain languages, the ZWNJ is necessary for unambiguously specifying the correct typographic form of a character sequence.

The ASCII control code unit separator was formerly used.

The picture shows how the code looks when it is rendered correctly, and in every row the correct and incorrect pictures should be different. On a system which not configured to display the Unicode correctly, the correct display and the incorrect one may look the same, or either of them may be significantly different from the corresponding picture.

In German typography, ligatures may not cross the constituent boundaries within compounds. Thus, in the first German example, the prefix  is separated from the rest of the word to prohibit the ligature fl. Similarly, in English, some argue ligatures should not cross morpheme boundaries. For example, in some words 'fly' and 'fish' are morphemes but in others they're not; therefore, by their reasoning, words like 'deaf‌ly' and 'self‌ish' (here shown with the non-joiner) should not have ligatures (respectively of fl and fi) while 'dayfly' and 'catfish' should have them.

Persian uses this character extensively for certain prefixes, suffixes and compound words. It is necessary for disambiguating compounds from non-compound words, which use a full space.

It is used to signify that there are no vowels (specifically 'a' or 'ə') in between the two consonant letters as  would otherwise be pronounced either /ˈsa.ɪnas/ or /ˈsa.ɪnəs/. A space would separate the phrase into different words, where phrases such as  would now mean 'to sign the Arabic letter sin' ( in Latin script.)

Use of ZWNJ to display alternative forms 

In Indic scripts, insertion of a ZWNJ after a consonant either with a halant or before a dependent vowel prevents the characters from being joined properly:

In Devanagari, the characters  and  typically combine to form , but when a ZWNJ is inserted between them,  (code: क्&zwnj;ष) is seen instead.

In Kannada, the characters ನ್ and ನ combine to form ನ್ನ, but when a ZWNJ is inserted between them, ನ್‌ನ is displayed. That style is typically used to write non-Kannada words in Kannada script: "Facebook" is written as ಫೇಸ್‌ಬುಕ್, though it can be written as ಫೇಸ್ಬುಕ್. ರಾಜ್‌ಕುಮಾರ್ and ರಾಮ್‌ಗೊಪಾಲ್ are examples of other proper nouns that need ZWNJ.

In Bengali, when the Bengali letter য occurs at the end of a consonant cluster—i.e., য preceded by a ◌্ (hôsôntô)—it appears in a special shape, known as the য-ফলা (ja-phala), such as in ক্য (ক ্  য). However, when the Bengali letter র occurs at the beginning of a consonant cluster—i.e., র succeeded by a hôsôntô—it appears in a special shape, known as the রেফ (reph). Thus, the sequence র ্ য is rendered by default as র্য. When the য-ফলা shape needs to be retained rather than the রেফ shape, the ZWNJ is inserted right after র, i.e., র&zwnj;্য to render র‌্য. র‌্য is commonly used for loanwords from English such as র‍্যান্ডম (random). Words like উদ্‌ঘাটন (code: উদ্&zwnj;ঘাটন) where the hôsôntô needs to be displayed explicitly also require ZWNJ inserted after the hôsôntô.

Symbol 

The symbol to be used on keyboards which enable the input of the ZWNJ directly is standardized in Amendment 1 (2012) of ISO/IEC 9995-7:2009 "Information technology – Keyboard layouts for text and office systems – Symbols used to represent functions" as symbol number 81, and in IEC 60417 "Graphical Symbols for use on Equipment" as symbol no. IEC 60417-6177-2.

See also 
 Zero-width joiner
 Zero-width space
 Word divider

References

External links 
 Using the ZWNJ in Persian
 Every character has a story #19: U+200c and U+200d (ZERO WIDTH [NON] JOINER)

Control characters
Persian orthography
Typography
Unicode formatting code points